Nemophora ahenea is a moth of the Adelidae family. It is found in Japan and Taiwan.

The wingspan is 10–13 mm.

References

Moths described in 1930
Adelidae
Moths of Japan
Moths of Taiwan